A travel survey (or travel diary or travel behavior inventory) is a survey of individual travel behavior.  Most surveys collect information about an individual (socio-economic, demographic, etc.), their household (size, structure, relationships), and a diary of their journeys on a given day (their start and end location, start and end time, mode of travel, accompaniment and purpose of travel).

Major travel surveys are conducted in metropolitan areas typically once a decade. Some regions, notably metropolitan Seattle, Washington conduct a panel survey, which interviews the same people year after year, to see how their particular behavior evolves over time.

Recent or continuous city-wide travel surveys
Auckland, New Zealand - A travel survey was conducted in 2006 and involved 6,000 households in the greater Auckland region.

Brisbane, Australia - The South East Queensland Travel Survey collects travel data in the Greater Brisbane region and the neighbouring areas of Gold Coast and Sunshine Coast. The continuous survey commenced in 2003 and surveys around 6,000 households every two years.

Hobart, Australia - The Greater Hobart Household Travel Survey collects information from 200 households each month.

London, United Kingdom - The London Travel Demand Survey covers 8,000 households annually. Data is collected via face to face interviews.

Sydney, Australia - The continuous Household Travel Survey collects travel data annually for approximately 3,500 households in the Sydney Greater Metropolitan Region.

Washington, United States - The Metropolitan Washington Council of Governments conducted a 10,000 household survey in 2007.

Recent or continuous regional travel surveys
Greater Golden Horseshoe, Canada - the Transportation Tomorrow Survey (TTS) has been conducted every five years since 1986, surveying approximately 5% of households across the region. The 2016 TTS is one of the largest and most comprehensive travel surveys in North America, comprising a dataset of 162,708 surveys conducted online and by phone.

Recent or continuous country-wide travel surveys
Denmark's most recent National Travel was initiated in 2006 and has been going on continuously since then. The interviews are conducted using the internet and telephone interviews.

Germany is conducting its National Travel Survey since 1994 on a yearly basis. Each household member fills in a travel diary in which he records each trip made during the course of one week. Despite this yearly survey there is another non regular scheduled survey which is conducted again in 2008. 25,000 households are expected to participate.

The Netherlands National Travel Survey surveyed around 34,500 households in 2003. The survey has been conducted yearly since 1985, but with some changes in methodology. Survey forms are mailed out, with follow-up motivational phone calls.

In New Zealand the Ministry of Transport annually surveys 4,600 households for a two-day period. Data is collected via face to face interviews.

The United Kingdom Department for Transport conducts the National Travel Survey 

The United States last conducted the National Household Travel Survey in 2017.

South Africa conducted its first National Household Travel Survey in 2003. Successful interviews were held with 45,000 households.

Sweden's most recent National Travel Survey (RES) was conducted in 2006-06.

See also 
 Travel behavior
 Transportation planning
 Metropolitan Travel Survey Archive
 NREL https://www.nrel.gov/transportation/secure-transportation-data/

Notes and references

External links 
 Metropolitan Travel Survey Archive
 Household Travel Surveys on the WWW
 Travel Survey Manual online

Transportation planning
Market research
Travel
Surveys (human research)